The Nordenfelt gun was a multiple-barrel organ gun that had a row of up to twelve barrels. It was fired by pulling a lever back and forth and ammunition was gravity fed through chutes for each barrel. It was produced in a number of different calibres from rifle up to 25 mm (1 inch). Larger calibres were also used, but for these calibres the design simply permitted rapid manual loading rather than true automatic fire. This article covers the anti-personnel rifle-calibre (typically 0.45 inch) gun.

Development 
The weapon was designed by a Swedish engineer, Helge Palmcrantz. He created a mechanism to load and fire a multiple barreled gun by simply moving a single lever backwards and forwards. It was patented in 1873.

Production of the weapon was funded by a Swedish steel producer and banker (later weapons maker) named Thorsten Nordenfelt, who was working in London. The name of the weapon was changed to the Nordenfelt gun. A plant producing the weapon was set up in England with sales offices in London and long demonstrations were conducted at several exhibitions. The weapon was adopted by the British Royal Navy, as an addition to their Gatling and Gardner guns.

During a demonstration held at Portsmouth, a ten-barrelled version of the weapon, firing rifle-calibre cartridges, fired 3,000 rounds of ammunition in 3 minutes and 3 seconds without stoppage or failure.

However, with the development of the Maxim gun, the weapon was eventually outclassed. Nordenfelt merged in 1888 with the Maxim Gun Company to become Maxim Nordenfelt Guns and Ammunition Company Limited.

At least one Nordenfelt was re-activated for the 1966 film Khartoum and can be seen firing in the river boat sequence.

Users 

 Egypt

:Seven were in use at the time of the Balkan Wars

 Qajar dynasty:Had a battery of four guns in the 1890s

Conflicts 
Egyptian-Ethiopian War

War of The Pacific 

Mahdist Wars

Federalist Revolution

Revolta Da Armada

First Matabele War

First Sino-Japanese War

War of Canudos

Boxer Rebellion

Balkan Wars

See also 
 1-inch Nordenfelt gun

Weapons of comparable role, performance and era 
 Gardner gun: similar hand-cranked machine gun

References 

 George M. Chinn, The Machine Gun. History, Evolution, and Development of Manual, Automatic, and Airborne Repeating Weapons, Volume I, Washington, 1951.
 C. Sleeman, "The Development of Machine Guns", The North American review, Volume 139, Issue 335, October 1884
 Ellis, John. 1975. The Social History of the Machine Gun. New York: Pantheon Books.

External links 

 Handbook for Gardner and Nordenfelt rifle calibre machine guns. 1889, 1891
 Handbook of the 0.45 inch 5 barrel Nordenfelt guns, marks I and II, 1888 at State Library of Victoria
 Handbook of the 0.45 inch, 5-barrel Nordenfelt guns, Marks I and II 1894 at State Library of Victoria
 Handbook for the 0.303" Nordenfelt 3-barrel, and Gardner 2-barrel, converted from 0.4 and 0.45" M.H. chamber (magazine rifle chamber) : mounted on carriages, field, machine gun, infantry and carriage, parapet, machine gun. London : H.M.S.O. 1900
 Animations and technical descriptions of 2, 4 and 5-barrel Machine Guns (Requires QuickTime and not suitable for slow-speed links)
 Nordenfelt Video—video of Nordenfelt machine gun firing
 video of mechanism

Victorian-era weapons of the United Kingdom
Early machine guns
Multi-barrel machine guns
Weapons of the Ottoman Empire